Watchtower (also known as Cruel and Unusual) is a 2001 Canadian thriller film directed by George Mihalka and starring Tom Berenger, Rachel Hayward and Tygh Runyan.

Premise
A brother and sister move to a sleepy Oregon town and are befriended by a stranger with a magnetic personality on a summer sabbatical.

Cast
 Tom Berenger as Art Stoner
 Rachel Hayward as Kate O'Conner
 Tygh Runyan as Mike O'Conner

Reception
Moria.co gave the film a good review. Watchtower got three stars and the reviewer stated: "Watchtower/Cruel and Unusual offers Mihalka the best budget he has ever had to date and he does wonders with it. There is some particularly beautiful and impressive location scenery – despite being set in Seattle, the film is in actuality shot a little further up the coast in the somberly beautiful area of Vancouver Island, where Mihalka does a fine job of capturing the verisimilitude of a small fishing town."

Reviewer M. Lion of the website chickflickingreviews.com called it a "well made movie" and noted that the twists were "quite fun".

References

External links
 
 
 Watchtower at Moria.co
 Watchtower at BBFC
 Watchtower at Movie-Roulette

2001 films
2000s thriller films
Canadian thriller films
English-language Canadian films
Films set in Oregon
2000s English-language films
Films directed by George Mihalka
2000s Canadian films